Woosnam's broad-headed mouse or Woosnam's zelotomys (Zelotomys woosnami) is a species of rodent in the family Muridae.
It is found in Angola, Botswana, Namibia, and South Africa.
Its natural habitat is dry savanna.

References
 Coetzee, N. & Van der Straeten, E. 2004.  Zelotomys woosnami.   2006 IUCN Red List of Threatened Species.   Downloaded on 20 July 2007.

Zelotomys
Mammals described in 1906
Taxonomy articles created by Polbot